This is a list of tennis players who have represented the Italy Fed Cup team in an official Fed Cup match. Italy have taken part in the competition since 1963.

Players

References

External links
Federazione Italiana Tennis

Fed Cup
Lists of Billie Jean King Cup tennis players